The 2019 Washington wildfire season officially began in March 2019.

Government preparation
In January 2019, the Washington Commissioner of Public Lands Hilary Franz proposed a $55 million, 10-year plan to combat fires that included greatly expanded budgeting for 30 new full-time and 40 seasonal firefighters, new training academies, new firefighting equipment including aircraft, and a new "rangeland" firefighting plan for the state.

Environment
Drought conditions existed in over half of Washington counties in May 2019. Many water basins were at half their median snowpack level, and the state overall was at its fourth lowest level in 30 years according to the Washington State Department of Ecology.

Fires and smoke

There were 24 Western Washington wildfires reported before the spring equinox, including a  blaze near Mount St. Helens that heavily damaged one structure.

The 243 Command Fire was the first large fire of the season.

References

External links
Washington wildfires, Washington State DNR

Wildfires
 
2019